The 2009–10 Western Football League season (known as the 2009–10 Toolstation Western Football League for sponsorship reasons) was the 108th in the history of the Western Football League, a football competition in England. Teams were divided into two divisions; the Premier and the First.

The league champions for the tenth time in their history were Bideford, who took promotion to the Southern League. The champions of Division One were Wells City.

Premier Division
The Premier Division featured two new clubs in a league of 20 teams, reduced from 21 the previous season after Frome Town were promoted to the Southern League, and Chard Town and Devizes Town were relegated to the First Division:

Larkhall Athletic, champions of the First Division.
Longwell Green Sports, runners up in the First Division.

Final table

First Division
The First Division featured two new clubs in a league of 20 after Larkhall Athletic and Longwell Green Sports were promoted to the Premier Division:

Chard Town, relegated from the Premier Division
Devizes Town, relegated from the Premier Division
Almondsbury F.C. changed their name to Almondsbury UWE F.C. after an agreement with the University of the West of England.

Final table

References
 League tables

External links
 Western League Official Site

2009-10
9